Leonardo Rubén Novo Pérez (born 13 October 1990 in Montevideo) is an Uruguayan footballer who plays as an attacking midfielder for Progreso.

References

1990 births
Living people
Footballers from Montevideo
Uruguayan footballers
Association football midfielders
El Tanque Sisley players
Real Valladolid Promesas players